The 2021 Toronto Defiant season will be the third season of Toronto Defiant's existence in the Overwatch League and the team's first under head coach Kim "KDG" Dong-gun.

Preceding offseason

Roster changes 

The Defiant entered free agency with eleven free agents, seven of which became free agents due to the Defiant not exercising the option to retain the player for another year.

Acquisitions 
The Defiant's first offseason acquisition was Park "Aztac" Jeong-su, a rookie support player coming off of an Overwatch Contenders Korea championship on team WSG Phoenix while on a loan from Uprising Academy, who was signed on November 17, 2020. Two days later, they signed An "Ansoonjae" Soon-jae, another rookie support player previously playing for Contenders team Element Mystic. On November 21, Toronto signed Kim "Sado" Su-min, a veteran tank player coming off of a season with the Philadelphia Fusion in which he was a top-five main tank player in the league. Two days later, the Defiant acquired damage player Jeong "Heesu" Hee-su from the Philadelphia Fusion. The following day, they signed Choi "Michelle" Min-hyuk, a "consistently impressive" veteran tank player coming off a 2020 Grand Finals season with the Seoul Dynasty. The Defiant made one acquisition in December; on December 11, they signed "Na1st" Lee Ho-sung, a rookie damage player specializing in projectile heroes coming from Contenders team T1. The team's final acquisition was Mun "Lastro" Jung-won, a support player who had recently been released from the Los Angeles Valiant, signing on February 10, 2021.

Departures 
Nine of the Defiant's eleven free agents did not return, three of which signed with other teams, beginning with support player Bak "Kariv" Young-seo signing with the Guangzhou Charge on November 10, 2020. On December 9, damage player Brady "Agilities" Girardi signed with the Los Angeles Valiant. The team's final free agent to sign to another team was support player Harrison "Kruise" Pond, who signed with Overwatch Contenders team Young and Beautiful on March 10, 2021. Four of the Defiant's free agents announced their retirements in the offseason: damage player Lane "Surefour" Roberts, damage player Thomas "Zykk" Hosono, tank player Sebastian "Numlocked" Barton, and support player Park "Roky" Joo-sung. Damage player Liam "Mangachu" Campbell and tank player Andreas "Nevix" Karlsson did not sign with a team in the 2020 offseason.

Regular season 
The Defiant began their 2021 season on April 17, playing against Canadian rivals Vancouver Titans in the May Melee qualifiers. They won their opener 3–1. Despite starting their following match against the Atlanta Reign with a 0–2 deficit, Toronto defeated the Reign 3–2 to close the week undefeated.

On May 25, the Defiant announced that it had three positive COVID-19 cases within the organization, including damage player Andreas "Logix" Berghmans. Two days later, they signed Luka "Aspire" Rolovic, a damage player from Overwatch Contenders team American Tornado, on a 30-day contract.

Final roster

Transactions 
Transactions of/for players on the roster during the 2020 regular season:

On May 27, the Defiant signed damage player Luka "Aspire" Rolovic on a 30-day contract.
On June 21, tank player Adam "Beast" Denton retired.

Standings

Game log

Regular season 

|2021 season schedule

Postseason

References 

Toronto Defiant
Toronto Defiant
Toronto Defiant seasons